James C. A. Snyder  (September 15, 1847 – December 1, 1922) was an American professional baseball player. In the National Association he was the regular shortstop of the 1872 Brooklyn Eckfords.

Snyder previously played for the Eckfords in the second of their four professional seasons, 1870. While the team won 2, tied 1, and lost 12 pro matches, he was a catcher and shortstop. Overall, he appeared in 19 games on record, two fewer than the team leaders, and he was a weak batter in the company of his teammates.

References

External links

1847 births
1922 deaths
19th-century baseball players
Baseball players from New York (state)
Brooklyn Eckfords (NABBP) players
Brooklyn Eckfords players
Major League Baseball shortstops
People from Brooklyn
Burials at Cypress Hills Cemetery